A Bearing reducer in engineering is a bearing that designates the full integration of high-precision reduction gear and high-precision radial-axial bearing in a compact unit. This transmission system allows the utilization of the bearing reducer in several technics, such as robotics and automation, machine tools, measuring equipment, navigation systems, the aircraft industry, the military and medicine field, the woodworking field, the printers branch, the machines for the textile industry and glass treatment, and the filling machines.

References

Bearings (mechanical)